Williams-Ellis is a surname and may refer to:

 Clough Williams-Ellis (1883–1978), British architect
 David Williams-Ellis (born 1959), British sculptor
 Hywel Williams-Ellis, British actor 
 Susan Williams-Ellis (1918–2007), English pottery designer, who was best known for co-founding Portmeirion Pottery